Alina Khakimova (born 25 September 1997) is an Uzbekistani professional racing cyclist, who last rode for the UCI Women's Team  during the 2019 women's road cycling season.

References

External links

1997 births
Living people
Uzbekistani female cyclists
Place of birth missing (living people)
Triathletes at the 2014 Asian Games
Triathletes at the 2018 Asian Games
Asian Games competitors for Uzbekistan
21st-century Uzbekistani women